Rap rock is a fusion genre that fuses vocal and instrumental elements of hip hop with various forms of rock. Rap rock's most popular subgenres include rap metal and rapcore, which include heavy metal and hardcore punk-oriented influences, respectively.

Characteristics
AllMusic describes rap metal as having "big, lurching beats and heavy, heavy riffs" that "occasionally ... [sound] as if the riffs were merely overdubbed over scratching and beat box beats", and described rap rock as having a more organic sound, characterizing many songs in the genre as rock songs in which the vocals were rapped rather than sung. AllMusic also states that the rhythms of rap rock are rooted in those of hip hop, with more funk influences than normal hard rock.

Hed PE, which fuses punk rock with hip hop, occasionally incorporates reggae and heavy metal influences. According to Rolling Stone writer Rob Kemp, Incubus' 1997 album S.C.I.E.N.C.E. "links funk metal to the rap metal". Kottonmouth Kings perform a style which they refer to as "psychedelic hip-hop punk rock". Kid Rock incorporates country and Southern rock influences. Rock started out with a straight forward hip hop sound in his debut album Grits Sandwiches for Breakfast, but he shifted to rap rock in his 2nd studio album The Polyfuze Method. Kid Rock did not become popular until his 4th studio album Devil Without a Cause. He later shifted to singing more, and is backed by a 10 piece band. Everlast fuses blues and rock with hip hop, performing with a live band that includes a DJ. Proyecto Eskhata, a Spanish band, is noted for combining progressive rock, hip hop and heavy metal, a sound categorized as progressive rap metal. An example of a rap rock album is Collision Course, a collaboration between the rapper Jay Z and the band Linkin Park.

The lyrical themes of rap rock vary. According to AllMusic, "most rap-metal bands during the mid- to late '90s blended an ultra-aggressive, testosterone-heavy theatricality with either juvenile humor or an introspective angst learned through alternative metal". However, as the genre began to become more established, several bands branched out into political or social commentary in their lyrics, most notably Rage Against the Machine and Senser which distinguished them from less politically concerned bands such as Linkin Park and Limp Bizkit.

Although many nu metal bands incorporate hip hop beats, rap rock bands are always fronted by rappers. Rock bands generally not associated with rap rock have experimented with hip hop influences, including rapping. Such bands and artists have included Blondie, Rush, Beck and Cake. Many rappers have been noted for a prominent use of samples derived from rock songs, including Eminem, Ice-T, The Fat Boys, LL Cool J, Public Enemy, Whodini, Vanilla Ice, and Esham.

History

Early development (1980s)
One of the earliest examples of rapping in rock music is "Year of the Guru" by Eric Burdon and the Animals, a psychedelic rock song in which Eric Burdon, according to AllMusic, "[took] the role of a modern rapper". Another alleged example is “I Wanna Be Your Dog”, a 1969 song by garage rock and proto-punk band the Stooges. The Talking Heads' song "Crosseyed and Painless" (1980) features a rap break near its end; also the Psychedelic Furs song "Wedding Song" (1980) is essentially rapped.

In 1983, KISS released the song "All Hell's Breakin' Loose" on the album Lick It Up with singer Paul Stanley rapping the verses. In the same year, the German punk rock band Die Toten Hosen released one of the first German hip hop songs, "Hip Hop Bommi Bop". It also was one of the first rap rock crossovers ever. The song, created in collaboration with Fab 5 Freddy, is a parody hip hop version of their song "Eisgekühlter Bommerlunder".

1984 may be viewed as something of a breakthrough year for the genre. Run–D.M.C.'s debut album featured the song "Rock Box", which included a rock guitar riff played by Eddie Martinez. Also in 1984, the Beastie Boys released their single "Rock Hard". The song featured an unauthorized sample of AC/DC's Back in Black.  LL Cool J delivered "Rock the Bells", where he had fused conventional rap lyrics over a hard rock arrangement. Red Hot Chili Peppers vocalist Anthony Kiedis employed rapping on the band's 1984 self-titled debut album as well as subsequent releases. In a 2002 interview with Penthouse, Kiedis stated "We were early in creating the combination of hardcore funk with hip-hop-style vocals.  We became, maybe, an inspiration to Limp Bizkit, Kid Rock, Linkin Park – all these other bands that are doing that now."

Run-D.M.C., Beastie Boys, and Red Hot Chili Peppers all shared a common producer: Rick Rubin. In many ways, he may be considered the father of rap rock.

1984 also featured a novelty single produced by NY metal label Megaforce Records. Label owner Jon Zazula teamed up (anonymously) with the Rods and released the single "Metal Rap". Credited as The Lone Rager, the song presents a history of heavy metal, name-checking bands from Cream to Metallica.

In 1985, Run-D.M.C. continued their exploration of rock/hip-hop crossovers with the title track from their album King of Rock. In 1986, the experiments produced mainstream success when Run–D.M.C. collaborated with Aerosmith on a remake of the latter's earlier song, "Walk This Way", first released in 1975. The success of the "Walk This Way" remake helped bring hip hop into popularity with a mainstream white audience. It was the first Billboard top ten rap rock success played on radio.

In 1989, Tone-Lōc's "Wild Thing" featured a sample of Van Halen's "Jamie's Cryin'". Included on his debut album, Lōc-ed After Dark, the song hit number 2 on the Billboard Hot 100, and propelled the album to number one.

In 1987, thrash metal band Anthrax released "I'm the Man", one of the first rap metal songs. The song features the lyric, "A heavy metal band raps a different way / We like to be different and not cliche." In 1991, Anthrax collaborated with political hip hop outfit Public Enemy on a version of the latter's "Bring the Noise", which saw rapped vocals shared between the Anthrax's Scott Ian and Public Enemy's Chuck D over a heavy electric guitar and electric bass riff. Public Enemy's track, "She Watch Channel Zero?!" features Chuck D rapping over a riff from the Slayer song "Angel of Death".

Rap rock began to enter the mainstream arena in the 1990s. American rock bands such as 311, 24-7 Spyz, Faith No More and Rage Against the Machine fused rock and hip hop influences. Simultaneously, British bands like Pop Will Eat Itself and Senser were similarly shaping the genre across Europe. The soundtrack for the 1993 film Judgment Night featured 11 collaborations between hip hop and rock musicians. Urban Dance Squad mixed funk, heavy metal, hip hop and punk. Biohazard, who collaborated with hardcore hip hop group Onyx on the track "Judgement Night" from the soundtrack of the same name, is also considered to be a pioneering act in the genre. Cypress Hill's Black Sunday featured a rock-based sound and artwork which, according to AllMusic reviewer Steve Huey, resembled that of heavy metal bands.

Swedish band Clawfinger were one of the early bands to pioneer rap metal outside the US, gaining popularity with their debut Deaf Dumb Blind, which sold over 700,000 copies as stated on their Facebook.

Mainstream popularity (1990s and early 2000s)
Rap rock gained mainstream popularity in the 1990s. Rap rock bands and artists with mainstream success included 311, Bloodhound Gang, Kid Rock and Limp Bizkit. Rap rock's popularity continued in the early 2000s.

In 1990, Faith No More's song "Epic" peaked at number 9 on the Billboard Hot 100. 311 became popular in the 1990s; the band's self-titled album was certified 3× platinum by the Recording Industry Association of America (RIAA) in 1998. 311's album Transistor was certified platinum by the RIAA one month after its release date. In 1996, Rage Against the Machine's album Evil Empire peaked at number 1 on the Billboard 200. Evil Empire was certified 3× platinum by the RIAA on May 24, 2000. Rage Against the Machine's self-titled album also was certified 3× platinum by the RIAA on May 24, 2000. Rage Against the Machine's self-titled album peaked at number 2 on the Catalog Albums chart in 1996. In 1998, Kid Rock released his album Devil Without a Cause. The album was very popular; selling a lot during both 1999 and 2000, Devil Without a Cause eventually was certified 11× platinum by the RIAA. Limp Bizkit's 1999 album Significant Other peaked at number 1 on the Billboard 200, selling 643,874 copies in its first week of release, topping over one million sold in two weeks, and being eventually certified 7× platinum. Significant Other sold at least 7,237,123 copies in the United States. In November 1999, Rage Against the Machine's album The Battle of Los Angeles peaked at number 1 on the Billboard 200. The Battle of Los Angeles was certified 2× platinum by the RIAA one month after its release date.

The controversial Woodstock '99 festival has been pinpointed as a defining moment of the rap rock era. It featured various artists associated with rap rock/rap metal, such as Insane Clown Posse, Kid Rock, Limp Bizkit, Rage Against the Machine, Red Hot Chili Peppers and Reveille, as well as bands from similar styles such as nu metal and alternative metal (Korn, Godsmack, Sevendust).

In 2000, P.O.D.'s album The Fundamental Elements of Southtown was certified platinum by the RIAA. The Fundamental Elements of Southtown song "Rock the Party (Off the Hook)" peaked at number 1 on MTV's Total Request Live. In 2000, Limp Bizkit's third studio album Chocolate Starfish and the Hot Dog Flavored Water set a record for highest week-one sales of a rock album, selling over 1,000,000 copies in the United States in its first week of release—400,000 of which sold on its first day of release, making it the fastest-selling rock album ever and breaking the world record held for seven years by Pearl Jam's Vs. Chocolate Starfish and the Hot Dog Flavored Water by Limp Bizkit sold at least 8,000,000 copies in the United States. Rage Against the Machine's album Renegades was certified platinum by the RIAA one month after its release date. In 2001, Papa Roach's 2000 album Infest was certified 3× platinum by the RIAA. In March 2001, Crazy Town's song "Butterfly" peaked at number 1 on the Billboard Hot 100. In February 2001, Crazy Town's album The Gift of Game was certified platinum by the RIAA. In the United States, The Gift of Game sold 1,500,000 copies. Linkin Park's 2000 album Hybrid Theory was the best-selling album of 2001, selling more than 4.81 million copies during that year. In 2005, Hybrid Theory was certified diamond by the RIAA. Hybrid Theory song "In the End" peaked at number 2 on the Billboard Hot 100 and number 1 on the Mainstream Top 40 chart. In 2002, P.O.D.'s album Satellite was certified 3× platinum by the RIAA. In 2002, Eminem's rap rock song "Lose Yourself" peaked at number 1 on the Billboard Hot 100. In 2003, Linkin Park released its album Meteora. Meteora peaked at number 1 on the Billboard 200 and sold at least 810,000 copies in its first week of being released. Meteora sold at least 6,100,000 copies in the United States.

New era (late 2000s–2020s)
At the end of the 2000s, the genre was considered to be in a decline, in spite of Linkin Park and P.O.D.'s continued success.

During the 2010s, a new-wave of artists, including Death Grips and the record-breaking duo Twenty One Pilots have incorporated hip hop music with other rock-related styles, such as indie rock and industrial rock. In 2017, New York singer and rapper Lil Peep represented the latest implementation of Rap Rock, offering a sound containing mainly electric guitars, trap drums, and an unorthodox mixing process that conveyed a soft  yet screamy style. Pitchfork Rap rock elements were also found in the music of emerging trap artists born in the 1990s, such as XXXTENTACION, ZillaKami, Juice WRLD, Lil Uzi Vert, Lil Yachty and Post Malone.

Rapcore

Rapcore is a fusion genre of hip hop and punk rock or hardcore punk. Beastie Boys, formerly a hardcore punk group, began working in the hip hop genre. Their debut album, Licensed to Ill, largely featured a rock-based sound. Dee Dee Ramone also contributed to the genre with his 1987 single "Funky Man", under the name "Dee Dee King". Biohazard is considered to be a strong influence on the genre's development. Huntington Beach-based punk band Hed PE performs a fusion of styles ranging from hip hop and reggae to punk rock, hardcore punk and heavy metal. Although they are considered to be performers in the rapcore genre, they refer to their musical style as "G-punk". Kottonmouth Kings perform a style which they refer to as "psychedelic hip-hop punk rock". The earliest formative rapcore bands were Downset., 311, Dog Eat Dog, Rage Against the Machine, Every Day Life and E.Town Concrete. Professional critic Mark Allan Powell considers the rap rock song "Jesus Freak" by DC Talk, which was marginalized by many critics due to its Christian lyrical content, the turning point of when the popularity of grunge gave way to rapcore.

Some practitioners notably take influence from heavy metal, to the point that groups are also associated with alternative metal, like Sevendust and Darwin's Waiting Room. Because of this, rapcore is sometimes considered a subgenre of alternative metal.

Among the first wave of bands to gain mainstream success were 311, Bloodhound Gang and Limp Bizkit. Although the popularity of rapcore declined, some believe that rapcore may regain popularity, with younger music fans discovering bands in the genre. Drew Simollardes of the band Reveille stated, "I feel like lately it’s more appropriate. People are sick of a lot of the stuff that’s out there right now."

Rapcore band Fever 333 formed in 2017, made up of members Jason Aalon Butler (formerly of Letlive), Stephen Harrison (formerly of the Chariot) and Aric Improta of Night Verses, and their single "Made an America" from the album by the same name was nominated for Best Rock Performance at the 61st Annual Grammy Awards in 2019.

See also
 List of rap rock bands

References

Bibliography
 

 
1980s in music
1990s in music
2000s in music
20th-century music genres
21st-century music genres
American styles of music
American rock music genres
Fusion music genres
Hip hop genres